The Weekend is the debut studio album by New Zealand Group Smashproof. It was released on March 23, 2009

Track listing

Charts

References 

 http://www.c4tv.co.nz/Music/Smashproof/tabid/940/language/en-US/Default.aspx
 http://www.digirama.co.nz/albumdetails.aspx?MediaID=1130109

Smashproof albums
2009 debut albums